Martina Hingis was the defending champion, but lost in the quarterfinals to Dominique Van Roost.

Sandrine Testud won the title, defeating Lindsay Davenport in final 7–5, 6–3.

Seeds
A champion seed is indicated in bold text while text in italics indicates the round in which that seed was eliminated. The top four seeds received a bye to the second round.

  Martina Hingis (quarterfinals)
  Lindsay Davenport (final)
  Jana Novotná (second round)
  Arantxa Sánchez Vicario (semifinals)
  Venus Williams (second round)
  Conchita Martínez (second round)
  Nathalie Tauziat (quarterfinals)
  Patty Schnyder (first round)

Draw

Final

Section 1

Section 2

External links
 1998 Porsche Tennis Grand Prix Draw

Porsche Tennis Grand Prix
1998 WTA Tour